The 2006 Grand Prix of Mosport was the eighth race for the 2006 American Le Mans Series season.  It took place on September 3, 2006.

Official results

Class winners in bold.  Cars failing to complete 70% of winner's distance marked as Not Classified (NC).

Statistics
 Pole Position - #16 Dyson Racing - Qualifying rained out, grid set according to practice times
 Fastest Lap - #20 Dyson Racing - 1:07.446
 Distance - 
 Average Speed -

References

External links
 2006 Grand Prix of Mosport Race Broadcast (American Le Mans Series YouTube Channel)

Mosport
Grand Prix of Mosport
Grand Prix of Mosport
Grand Prix of Mosport